Tillar is a town in Desha and Drew counties in the U.S. state of Arkansas. The population was 225 at the 2010 census. The area west of it was known as Tillar Station. Frank Tillar Memorial Methodist Episcopal Church, South is listed on the National Register of Historic Places.

Geography
Tillar is located at  (33.711383, -91.453026).

Demographics

As of the census of 2000, there were 240 people, 99 households, and 75 families residing in the city. The racial makeup of the city was 91.67% White, 5.83% Black or African American, 0.42% Native American, 1.25% from other races, and 0.83% from two or more races. 4.58% of the population were Hispanic or Latino of any race.

There were 99 households, out of which 30.3% had children under the age of 18 living with them, 64.6% were married couples living together, 6.1% had a female householder with no husband present, and 24.2% were non-families. 21.2% of all households were made up of individuals, and 14.1% had someone living alone who was 65 years of age or older.  \The average household size was 2.42 and the average family size was 2.79.

In the city the population was spread out, with 21.3% under the age of 18, 12.1% from 18 to 24, 26.3% from 25 to 44, 22.5% from 45 to 64, and 17.9% who were 65 years of age or older. The median age was 42 years. For every 100 females, there were 98.3 males.  For every 100 females age 18 and over, there were 94.8 males.

The median income for a household in the city was $29,792, and the median income for a family was $34,821. Males had a median income of $23,929 versus $22,500 for females. The per capita income for the city was $13,568. About 13.4% of families and 16.5% of the population were below the poverty line, including 16.7% of those under the age of eighteen and 19.0% of those 65 or over.

Education
Its school district is the McGehee School District.

There is a Christian school in Tillar, called Cornerstone Christian Academy.

Notable people
Arkansas State Representative Mark D. McElroy, who has represented District 11 since 2013, resides in Tillar.
Charlotte Tillar Schexnayder (December 25, 1923 - December 11, 2020), a native of Tillar, was a journalist and politician who edited the McGehee Times from 1944-1946 and 1948-1954. She then owned, edited and published the Dumas Clarion from 1954-1998. She was a member of the Arkansas House of Representatives from 1985-1999.

References

Towns in Arkansas
Towns in Desha County, Arkansas
Towns in Drew County, Arkansas